Geranin A is an A type proanthocyanidin of the propelargonidin sub type. Its structure is epi-afzelechin-(4β→8, 2β→O→7)-afzelechin.

Geranins A and B can be found in Geranium niveum and show antiprotozoal activity.

References 

Condensed tannin dimers